Slowly We Rot is the debut album by American death metal band Obituary. It was released on June 14, 1989 and is the only Obituary album to feature bassist Daniel Tucker. Lead guitarist Allen West would leave soon after but returned for the third album The End Complete (1992). It was re-released on January 27, 1997 on Roadrunner Records with remastered sound and liner notes. Despite being recorded in standard tuning and with Fender Stratocasters, it is considered to be one of the band's heavier efforts. The remainder of the band's output has been recorded in D tuning. A live version of the album, Slowly We Rot: Live & Rotting, was recorded in October 2020 and released in August 2022 on Relapse Records.

Track listing
All music by Obituary, all lyrics by John Tardy.

Personnel
Obituary
John Tardy – vocals
Allen West – lead guitar
Trevor Peres – rhythm guitar
Daniel Tucker – bass
Donald Tardy – drums
JP Chartier - lead guitar on tracks 13 and 14
 Jerome Grable - bass on tracks 13 and 14

Productions
Executive producer: Monte Conner
Arranged by Obituary
Produced, recorded & engineered by Scott Burns
Mixed by Scott Burns, Donald Tardy & John Tardy
Mastered by Mike Fuller

References

External links
Slowly We Rot at Media Club

1989 debut albums
Obituary (band) albums
Roadrunner Records albums
Albums produced by Scott Burns (record producer)
Albums recorded at Morrisound Recording